The 2005 E3 Prijs Vlaanderen was the 48th edition of the E3 Harelbeke cycle race and was held on 26 March 2005. The race started and finished in Harelbeke. The race was won by Tom Boonen of the Quick-Step team.

General classification

References

2005 in Belgian sport
2005